Oil acne is an occupational skin condition caused by exposure to oils used in industry.

See also 
 Soot tattoo
 List of cutaneous conditions

References

External links 

Acneiform eruptions